Olga Glok (born 16 December 1982) is a Russian long-distance runner who competes in marathon races. She represented her country at the 2009 World Championships in Athletics. She has a marathon best of 2:27:18 hours and has won the Prague Marathon and Twin Cities Marathon.

Biography
She made her debut over the distance at the 2004 Moscow Marathon, coming third in the national championship race with a time of 2:37:01 hours. Later that year she came third at the Istanbul Marathon. In 2005, she won the Bremerhaven Marathon and managed eighth at the Frankfurt Marathon. Her highlight of 2006 was a win at the Dresden Marathon in 2:35:26 hours, with her other performances being eighth at the Vienna City Marathon and fifth at the Russian Championships race.

Her breakthrough came in 2007 when she ran a personal best of 1:09:58 hours for the half marathon at the IAAF World Road Running Championships. Her 17th-place finish helped the Russian women to fifth in the team rankings. A marathon personal best followed at the Istanbul Marathon, where her time of 2:31:12 hours took her to third place. She improved this further to 2:30:40 hours in a tenth-place finish at the 2008 Paris Marathon and went on to win the Twin Cities Marathon that October.

A winning time of 2:28:27 hours at the 2009 Prague Marathon earned her a place on the national team. In the race at the 2009 World Championships in Athletics she came 29th overall. She placed ninth at the high-profile 2010 Amsterdam Marathon and was runner-up to Rasa Drazdauskaite at the Athens Classic Marathon (setting a season's best of 2:33:51 hours). Her sole marathon outing of 2011 was a run at the Dublin Marathon and she missed the podium with a fourth-place finish.

Glok set a personal best at the 2012 Vienna City Marathon, edging Helalia Johannes to second place with a finishing time of 2:27:18 hours.

References

External links

Living people
1982 births
Russian female marathon runners